Ayatollah may refer to: 
Ayatollah, title given to Shi'a mujtahids

More specifically the most notable Ayatollahs, holding the position of Supreme Leader of Iran are:
Ruhollah Khomeini
Ali Khamenei

The most senior ayatollahs are described as Grand Ayatollah or Marja'.
Details of specific ayatollahs may be found under
List of Maraji
List of deceased Maraji
List of Ayatollahs

Ayatollah may also refer to:
Ayatollah (producer), Lamont Dorrell, better known as Ayatollah, hip hop producer
"Ayatollah", a 1979 parody song by Steve Dahl.
Chris Jericho, professional wrestler nicknamed Ayatollah of Rock 'n' Rolla
The Ayatollah (football celebration), a football celebration used by Cardiff City
Ayatollah Dollar, a MiniCD EP by Muslimgauze
 'Ayatollah of Alabama', the nickname of judge Roy Moore